Thomas Pfeffer (born 15 September 1957) is a German sport shooter. He won a silver medal in 50 m Running Target in the 1980 Moscow Olympics.

References

1957 births
Olympic shooters of East Germany
Shooters at the 1976 Summer Olympics
Shooters at the 1980 Summer Olympics
Shooters at the 1988 Summer Olympics
Olympic bronze medalists for East Germany
Olympic medalists in shooting
Living people
Medalists at the 1980 Summer Olympics